Azul (Blue) is the seventh studio album recorded by Mexican singer and songwriter Cristian Castro. It was released by BMG U.S. Latin on June 5, 2001 (see 2001 in music). It was produced again by Colombian songwriter and record producer Kike Santander working last album Cristian's Mi Vida Sin Tu Amor (1999). It was nominated Grammy Award for Best Latin Pop Album in the 44th Annual Grammy Awards on February 27, 2002. The title track, "Azul", topped the Latin charts.

Track listing

Charts

Sales and certifications

References 

2001 albums
Cristian Castro albums
Spanish-language albums
Bertelsmann Music Group albums
Albums produced by Kike Santander